Ptychoptera minuta is a species of fly in the family Ptychopteridae. It is found in the  Palearctic.

References

Ptychopteridae
Insects described in 1919
Nematoceran flies of Europe